Alain Douarinou (1909–1987) was a French cinematographer. He was the younger brother of the art director Jean Douarinou.

Selected filmography
 The Time of the Cherries (1938)
 The West (1938)

References

Bibliography
 Curti, Roberto. Italian Gothic Horror Films, 1957-1969. McFarland, 2015.

External links

1909 births
1987 deaths
French cinematographers